100 Welsh Heroes was an opinion poll run in Wales as a response to the BBC's 100 Greatest Britons poll of 2002. It was carried out mainly on the internet, starting on 8 September 2003 and finishing on 23 February 2004. The results were announced on 1 March (St David's Day) 2004 and subsequently published in a book.

Conduct of the poll
The poll was operated by Culturenet Cymru, a Welsh Assembly-funded body based at the National Library of Wales in Aberystwyth. At the time of the results being announced the organisers claimed that the 81,323 nominations and votes made it the largest online poll conducted in Wales.

Former Labour leader Neil Kinnock, himself named in the poll, had, during the voting, drawn attention to a Welsh nationalist "plot" to have Owain Glyndŵr at number one, rather than the eventual winner, Aneurin Bevan. In August 2004 a former employee of Culturenet Cymru alleged that the poll had been rigged to avoid accusations of "dumbing-down", and to ensure that Owain Glyndŵr did not receive more votes than Aneurin Bevan, although these claims were later dismissed by the Welsh Government.

Only nine of the list of a hundred are female, of whom Catherine Zeta-Jones was the most popular, with 1136 votes.

Results
The top 100 were:

See also

 100 Great Welsh Women
 Greatest Britons spin-offs

References

External links
 100 Welsh Heroes
 BBC Article

Greatest Nationals
Lists of Welsh people
Heroes